Frederick Andrew Seaton (December 11, 1909 – January 16, 1974) was an American newspaperman and politician.  He represented the U.S. state of Nebraska in the U.S. Senate and served as U.S. Secretary of the Interior during Dwight D. Eisenhower's administration.

Early life 
Seaton was born in Washington, D.C. on December 11, 1909, the son of Dorothea Elizabeth (née Schmidt) and Fay Noble Seaton.  He attended the Manhattan High School in Manhattan, Kansas. He graduated from Kansas State University in 1931, and married Gladys Hope Dowd (November 5, 1910 – January 5, 1999) in the same year. They had four children: Donald Richard, Alfred Noble, Johanna Christine, and Monica Margaret Seaton. In 1937, Seaton moved to Hastings, Nebraska, where he was for many years the publisher of the Hastings Tribune.

Political career 
Seaton was active in Republican politics. He served in the unicameral Nebraska Legislature from 1945 to 1949.  He was appointed to the U.S. Senate on December 10, 1951, by Gov. Val Peterson to fill the vacancy created by the death of Kenneth S. Wherry. A Rockefeller Republican, Seaton was senator for less than a year; he had to vacate the post on November 4, 1952, when Dwight Griswold won the 1952 special election to complete the Senate term. He was the second of six Senators to serve during the fifteenth Senate term for Nebraska's Class 2 seat, from January 3, 1949 to January 3, 1955.

Seaton served in various White House and subcabinet posts in Eisenhower's administration, including Assistant Secretary of Defense for Legislative Affairs, before he was appointed as the U.S. Secretary of the Interior. He served in that office from June 8, 1956, until January 20, 1961.  During his tenure, Alaska and Hawaii became the 49th and 50th states admitted to the Union. He was instrumental in the passing of the Alaska Statehood Act, appointing & recommending pro-Alaska politicians to high positions, such as Ted Stevens to Senior Counsel to the Secretary of Interior (later becoming Solicitor in 1960) and Mike Stepovich to Governor of the Territory of Alaska.

He ran for governor of Nebraska in 1962 but was defeated by the incumbent Democrat, Gov. Frank B. Morrison (Olson, p. 335). Following his defeat, Seaton became a strong advocate for campaign finance reform in Nebraska.

Seaton died in Minneapolis, Minnesota, on January 16, 1974, and is interred in Parkview Cemetery in Hastings, Nebraska.

Further reading 
"Seaton, Fred(erick) A(ndrew)" in Current Biography 1956.
James C. Olson, History of Nebraska, Second Edition. (Lincoln, NE:  University of Nebraska Press, 1966).

External links 
Papers of Fred A. Seaton, Dwight D. Eisenhower Presidential Library
Congressional biography
"Fred Seaton" biography at Kansas State Historical Society Website

 

1909 births
1974 deaths
American newspaper publishers (people)
Kansas State University alumni
Presidential Medal of Freedom recipients
Republican Party Nebraska state senators
United States Secretaries of the Interior
American Episcopalians
Politicians from Washington, D.C.
Politicians from Manhattan, Kansas
People from Hastings, Nebraska
Republican Party United States senators from Nebraska
Eisenhower administration cabinet members
20th-century American politicians
United States Assistant Secretaries of Defense